Neal Tiemann (born December 22, 1982) is an American musician, currently the lead guitarist and songwriter of the rock band the Midwest Kings (MWK). He is a former rhythm guitarist for heavy metal band DevilDriver, and served as the lead guitarist for David Cook's band The Anthemic from 2008 to 2011. He spent most of 2009 on the Declaration Tour with Cook and served as the tour's music director. Tiemann played guitar on Cook's major label debut album David Cook (2008) as well as his independently released Analog Heart (2006). He has also played on Burn Halo's 2009 self-titled album and Bryan Jewett's album A Brief Look at the New You. Tiemann and the rest of The Anthemic worked on Cook's second album, This Loud Morning (2011). In January 2020, he was recruited as a touring lead guitarist for premiere deathcore band Carnifex, later officially joining in 2022.

Early career: 2001–2008 
Midwest Kings
David Cook – Analog Heart
Bryan Jewett – A Brief Look at the New You

2008–present 
Midwest Kings
To Have Heroes
Caroline's Spine – Work It Out
David Cook – David Cook, This Loud Morning
Burn Halo – Burn Halo
Uncle Kracker – Happy Hour
Carnifex (band)

Equipment 
Tiemann is seen playing Gibson guitars exclusively. He can be seen playing Gibson RD guitars such as an ebony with EMG pickups, a natural, and a silverburst. He also uses Gibson Les Paul guitars such as a sunburst and an ebony with 3 pickups and with gold hardware. He can also be seen with a black Gibson Explorer with EMG pickups and a Gibson Hummingbird in heritage cherry sunburst finish.

Appearances

On Tour 
From January 18–25, 2009, Tiemann traveled with bandmates David Cook (guitar and lead vocals), Andy Skib (rhythm guitar, keyboards, backup vocals), Kyle Peek (drums, backing vocals), and Joey Clement (bass guitar) to the Middle East to complete a USO Tour. The band visited seven bases on their trip to Kuwait and Iraq and played songs from David Cook as well as crowd-pleasing covers including Tenacious D's Fuck Her Gently and Van Halen's "Hot for Teacher".

In mid-February 2009, Tiemann embarked on a nationwide tour serving as Musical Director and Lead guitarist for The Declaration Tour to support the platinum-selling, major-label debut David Cook.  The tour began at Club Downunder in Tallahassee, Florida on February 13, 2009 and was originally set to end in Tulsa, Oklahoma on April 25, 2009. The tour was extended through the fall and came to a close on December 1, 2009 at The Fillmore in Charlotte, North Carolina after 154 shows.

In mid-May 2009, Tiemann and bandmates took a short break from the North American leg of the Declaration Tour to travel to Manila in the Philippines.  Tiemann made numerous appearances on Filipino television with David Cook leading up to a one night concert playing to upwards of 40,000 attendees at the SM Mall of Asia in Manila on May 16, 2009.

Music videos

Discography

Studio albums

Singles

Songwriting 

 *Co-Written with Andy Skib
 **Co-Written with Justin Briggs
 ***Co-Written with Zac Maloy
 ^ Co-Written with David Cook
 ^^ Co-Written with James Hart

References

External links 
 NealTiemann.com
 Tour Dates (via Official David Cook website)
 MWK Myspace
 Gibson Guitars

1982 births
Living people
American alternative rock musicians
American rock guitarists
American male guitarists
American rock songwriters
American rock singers
Singer-songwriters from Texas
People from Dallas
Musicians from Tulsa, Oklahoma
Singer-songwriters from California
Singer-songwriters from Oklahoma
Guitarists from Los Angeles
Guitarists from Oklahoma
Guitarists from Texas
21st-century American male singers
21st-century American singers
21st-century American guitarists
American male singer-songwriters